The 1981 Women's Pretty Polly British Open Squash Championships was held at the Coral Squash Club in Hove from 20–26 February 1981. The event was won by Vicki Hoffman who defeated Margaret Zachariah in the final.

Seeds

First round

Main Draw and results

References

Women's British Open Squash Championships
Squash in England
Women's British Open Squash Championship
Sport in Brighton and Hove
Women's British Open Squash Championship
British Open Squash Championship
Women's British Open Squash Championship